Batasari is a 1961 Indian Telugu-language drama film, produced and directed by Ramakrishna of Bharani Pictures. It was simultaneously made in Tamil as Kaanal Neer. Based on the Bengali novel Bardidi by Saratchandra Chatterjee, the film stars P. Bhanumathi and Akkineni Nageswara Rao, with music composed by Master Venu. Batasari was released on 30 June 1961, and Kaanal Neer on 21 July. Both versions did not succeed commercially.

Plot 

Surendranath "Suren" is the son of a Zamindar. His good-hearted stepmother, keeping in mind his health objects to his going to London for higher studies. A peeved Suren leaves home, reaches Madras, and stays with a rich man Apparao as a tutor to his younger daughter Pramila. Widowed even before she attained womanhood, Madhavi the eldest daughter of Apparao learns about the distrait ways of Suren and provides him with all his needs. When she writes about Suren to her friend Manorama, Manorama cautions her about showing too much interest in him. Hurt by her servant's gossip about her and Suren and also for neglecting his duty as a teacher, Madhavi chides Suren. Upset, he leaves on an aimless journey, meets with an accident and his father takes him home. Suren marries Shanti, but his heart longs for Madhavi. After performing her brother Siva Chandra's marriage, Madhavi hands over responsibilities to his wife and leaves for her home inherited from her husband, but finds that house under auction due to a plot hatched by Suren's estate manager. Not knowing it was Suren, Madhavi goes to confront the Zamindar. Meanwhile, Suren learns about the manager's wicked ways and despite his grave illness rushes on horseback to meet Madhavi to give her house documents. They meet. She expresses a wish to see his wife, Shanti, while he struggles to express his love for her. He dies in her lap.

Cast 
P. Bhanumathi as Madhavi
Akkineni Nageswara Rao as Surendranath "Suren"
J. V. Ramana Murthy as Siva Chandra
Mudigonda Lingamurthy as Diwan Alwar
Vangara as Pullaiah
B. R. Panthulu Apparao
Vinnakota Ramanna Pantulu as Raghavaiah
Boddapati as Anjaiah
Doraiswamy as Zamindar of Dharapuram
Shavukaru Janaki as Shanthi
Devika as Manorama
Suryakantham as Sundaramma
Chaya Devi as Poornamma
L. Vijayalakshmi as Dancer
Lakshmirajyam as Dancer
Baby Sasikala as Prameela

Production 
Batasari is based on the novel Bardidi by Saratchandra Chatterjee. It was simultaneously filmed in Tamil as Kaanal Neer. The Telugu version was originally titled Yendamavulu. Before and during the shoot, for inspiration, Akkineni Nageswara Rao was asked by Ramakrishna to watch Uttam Kumar's performance in the 1959 film version of Bardidi. Nageswara Rao complied, and even donned the getup just like Kumar, but held to his own on histrionics.

Soundtrack 
Music composed by Master Venu. Lyrics were written by Samudrala Sr. For Kaanal Neer, the lyrics were written by Kannadasan and Ku. Ma. Balasubramaniam.

Release and reception 
Batasari was released on 30 June 1961, and Kaanal Neer on 21 July 1961. The Indian Express said, "The standout feature of Kaanal Neer is the fascinating photography of young Venkat, particularly in the climax. In other technical respects, the film maintains a good standard." Both versions did not succeed commercially; according to historian Randor Guy, this was because audiences felt the story was too highbrow.

References

External links 
 
 

1960s multilingual films
1960s Tamil-language films
1960s Telugu-language films
1961 drama films
1961 films
Films based on works by Sarat Chandra Chattopadhyay
Films directed by P. S. Ramakrishna Rao
Films scored by Master Venu
Indian black-and-white films
Indian drama films
Indian multilingual films